Holland "Holly" Coors (August 25, 1920 – January 18, 2009) was an American conservative political activist and philanthropist who had been married to Joseph Coors, the president of Coors Brewing Company.

Coors was born Edith Holland Hanson on August 25, 1920 in Bangor, Maine. She moved to New York City where she worked as a model and considered becoming a fashion designer. In 1941 she married Joseph Coors, whom she had met on Nantucket, Massachusetts. Joseph Coors was the chief operating officer of the Golden, Colorado-based brewery founded by his grandfather Adolph Coors, which is part of Molson Coors Brewing Company as of 2009. The couple had five sons, Joe Jr., Jeff, Pete, Grover and John, before divorcing in 1987; Joseph died in 2003.

While considering running for election as Governor of Colorado in 1985, Coors told The Denver Post that the best way to help women was "not the Equal Rights Amendment but through free enterprise".

Coors served on the boards of the Heritage Foundation and the Federalist Society. She founded and was president of Women of our Hemisphere Achieving Together, an organization that assists women from Central America and the Dominican Republic, and served in senior positions for many other institutions and organizations. She was named to serve on the Board of Visitors of the United States Air Force Academy by President Ronald Reagan, who also appointed her goodwill ambassador for the Western Hemisphere during the National Year of the Americas (NYOTA). She was named to the White House Fellows Commission by President George H. W. Bush.

Coors died at age 88 on January 18, 2009 at her home in Golden and was survived by her five sons, 28 grandchildren and 24 great-grandchildren.

References

1920 births
2009 deaths
The Heritage Foundation
Federalist Society members
Colorado Republicans
Coors family
People from Bangor, Maine
People from Golden, Colorado
Philanthropists from Maine
Philanthropists from Colorado